Oluta is a Municipality in Veracruz, Mexico. It is located in south-east zone of the State of Veracruz, about 371 km from state capital Xalapa. It has a surface of 90.48 km2.

The municipality of  Oluta  is delimited to the north by Acayucan and Soconusco to the east by Texistepec, to the south-west by Sayula de Alemán and to the west by Acayucan.

It produces principally maize, rice, orange fruit, coffee and mango.

In  Oluta , June 24th takes place celebration in honor of San Juan Bautista, the Town's Patron Saint. Regarding food, you can find Memelas, different Kinds of Tamales with Popo as a drink, and Mexican Antojitos. 

You can find services like Laundry, food delivery (Hamburgers, Alitas, Tacos, Memelas, Pizza), vegetable delivery, Radio Taxi, Water Delivery. Stores installed in the town OXXO, DON NETO, SUPER DE TODO, YZA, FARMACIA GUADALAJARA, DOCTOR SIMI, BAHAMA and a mall PLAZA LA FLORIDA

Oluta is expected to be a City, due to is considering in the CORREDOR TRASISMICO project announced by Mexican President. The new municipal President HUICHO ALARCON will be working with statal government and the Federation in order to invite investors and companies to install in the Municipality.  

The weather in  Oluta  is warm all year with rains in summer and autumn. In the winter the temperatures are from 11 to 16 Celsius grade. Activities that are feasible all year: Walk, Bicycling, running, outdoor exercises, soccer, Volleyball, Basketball, and baseball.

References

External links 

  Municipal Official webpage
  Municipal Official Information

Municipalities of Veracruz